Emmanuel Akomaye Agim is a Nigerian judge who was chief justice of Gambia from 2009 to 2013 former chief justice of Swaziland. former justice at the Nigerian Courts of Appeal. and currently a Justice of the Supreme Court of Nigeria

Early life and education 
Agim was born on April 26, 1960, in Obudu, Cross River State, Nigeria. He obtained his first degree at University of Calabar LLB(Hons), then BL from Nigerian Law School Lagos and subsequently LLM from the University of Wolverhampton, United Kingdom.

Career 
Agim was enrolled as a legal practitioner on the 15th October 1986.

Professional experience 
Agim is a jurist, public prosecutor, private legal practitioner, legal writer, judicial trainer and administrator, Justice Ministry Administrator/Trainer of State Counsel, Commonwealth Crimes Victim Expert, Law office Manager, Adjunct Professor, Adviser/Resource Person on Environmental Laws.

Offices held 
Agim was the:

 Chief Judge, Republic of the Gambia
 Judge of the Supreme Court of the Gambia
 Chairman, General Legal Council
 Member, ECOWAS Council of Chief of Justices
Chairman, Legal Capacity Building Programme Board, The Gambia 
Chairman, Judicial Service Commission of The Gambia
Acting Justice of the Supreme Court, The Gambia
President, Court of Appeal of the Republic of the Gambia
Acting Chief Justice, Republic of the Gambia during a brief absence of the then chief justice
Chairman, National Council for Law Reporting of The Gambia
Member - Chancery of the Republic of Gambia
Judge Advocate, General Court Martial of The Gambia
Director of Public Prosecutions, Ministry of Justice, Republic of The Gambia
Managing Solicitor/Advocate, Veritas Chambers, No. 1A Agoja Road, Obudu, Cross River, Nigeria
Chairman, Nigerian Bar Association, Ogoja Branch, Cross River State, Nigeria
Secretary, Nigerian Bar Association, Ogoja Branch, Cross River State, Nigeria
Member, Board of Directors, Cross River State Government owned Estates Limited

Writings/Publications 

 Co-author of the Commonwealth Guidelines For the Treatment of Victims
 Crime (2003, ISBN 0-85092-725-0 /978-0-85092-725-2)
 Co-author of Pre-Trial Criminal Processes in the Commonwealth States - The Gambia Experience (2005, Banjul)
 United Nation Convention on International State of Goods Contracts (CISG) 1980 and the Gambia - The need for its adoption in The Gambia (unpublished work) LLM Desertation
 The Law of Sedition in Nigeria (Unpublished)
 Statements of Supreme Court in Nigeria (Unpublished)
 Gambian Criminal Appeals Cases Digest; Vol. 1&2 (Unpublished)
 Gambia Legal System, Critical Perspectives and Alternative Realities

Memberships 

 Member - International Bar Association
 Member - International Panel Association
 Member - Association of Lawyers for the Defence of the Unborn
 Member - Nigerian Bar Associatiion
 Member - Commonwealth Magistrates & Judges Association
 Member - World Jurist Association

Awards and honors 

 Order of the Republic of The Gambia (ORG) - one of the highest national honors of the Republic of The Gambia - conferred by the President of The Gambia
 Patron of the Nigerian Community of The Gambia - conferred by the Nigerian community occasion  of the 2007 Nigerian Independence Day in The Gambia
Special Recognition for distinguished academic work in law by the African Insurance Institute, The Gambia, during the 2008 convocation and 25 years anniversary ceremony.

References 

Chief justices of the Gambia
Nigerian judges
Living people
1960 births